The Diagonale (Festival of Austrian Film) is a film festival that takes place every March in Graz, Austria.

The festival was initially held under the auspices of the Austrian Film Commission in Salzburg from 1993 to 1995 but moved to Graz in 1998. Traditional cinema venues are Annenhof Kino, Schubertkino, KIZ RoyalKino, and the Filmzentrum im Rechbauerkino. At the end of the festival, expert juries award Austria's most highly endowed film prizes.

The Festival of Austrian Film has consolidated its position as a regionally based festival for film buffs that brings the industry and audience together, strengthens Austrian film, and attracts international attention.

History

First Years 
The first three Diagonale festivals were organized by the Austrian Film Commission in early December each year in cooperation with the Salzburg Festival in Salzburg. The festival was directed by filmmaker Peter Tscherkassky in 1993 and 1994, and Heinrich Mis (then director of the ORF program kunst-stücke) in 1995.

After a break, the festival moved to Graz. Its own supporting association "Forum österreichischer Film" was founded in 1998 under the leadership of Christine Dollhofer and Constantin Wulff, who presided over the association until 2003. In addition to film screenings, the program also includes discussions, audience talks, and exhibitions. In the first year in Graz, one hundred films were screened and prizes were awarded in three categories: a main prize, a prize for innovative cinema and a prize for newcomers. Later, a number of other prizes were added. In 1999, a prize for the best actor and actress was also awarded for the first time, although this was not the case again until 2008.

Since 2000 
The planning for the Diagonale 2004 initially began with a scandal, as Franz Morak, the State Secretary for the Arts responsible for the event, dismissed the previous program directors without explanation, despite their excellent performance, and replaced them with a new team without seeking consensus with the filmmakers concerned. Since this personnel selection met with opposition from nearly all filmmakers, it initially looked as if there might be two events with the same name: Morak's "official" Diagonale and an "unofficial" event set up by the media professionals themselves. Eventually, however, Morak relented and abandoned his event. After a restructuring of the sponsoring association and the willingness of numerous participants to volunteer, the Diagonale 2004 was able to take place in its usual form despite time pressure.

The background to Morak's intervention in the directorship is thought to be an attempt to make a more commercially oriented readjustment of the festival as well as a politically motivated "act of retaliation" against the film scene and the festival management, because the Diagonale positioned itself as a forum for anti-government protests and video works a few weeks after the controversial formation of the coalition between FPÖ and ÖVP in 2000. In the course of the controversy at the time over a petition printed in the festival catalog by numerous well-known filmmakers demanding the resignation of the government, the then Styrian regional councilor Hirschmann (ÖVP) even temporarily withheld the promised prize money from the state of Styria.

In the course of a restructuring by the supporting association "Forum österreichischer Film", the general assembly of the Diagonale appointed the three-person team Birgit Flos (artistic director), Robert Buchschwenter (production manager) and Georg Tillner (finance manager) as the new Diagonale management at the end of April 2004 on the suggestion of the Diagonale advisory board. After Buchschwenter and Tillner left, Oliver Testor took over the management of the festival in May 2005 until 2009.

The Diagonale 2006 took place from March 21 to 26 in Graz under the directorship of Birgit Flos. The festival center was set up in the Kunsthaus Graz for the first time in 2006. The UCI Annenhofkino, Schubertkino, KIZ RoyalKino, and the Filmzentrum im Rechbauerkino were the festival cinemas. In cooperation with the Kunsthaus Graz, the Diagonale also organized a highlight of the festival: In a tribute to the artist Maria Lassnig, her complete cinematic oeuvre was shown in newly restored copies.

In December 2006, Birgit Flos' contract was extended until the Diagonale 2008.

Also since 2006, there have been two equally endowed Grand Diagonale Prizes, for the best feature film and for the best documentary film.

Director Barbara Pichler (2009 to 2015) 
From 2009 to 2015, the festival was directed by curator, publicist, and film mediator Barbara Pichler, who established the festival as a mediation and discussion platform for Austrian cinema with a more streamlined programming and increased focus on international industry networking. Her original three-year contract was initially extended by the Diagonale's sponsoring association until 2014 and later, at Pichler's own request, for only one more year until 2015. The directorship of the Diagonale from the 2016 festival onwards was put out to tender again at the beginning of April 2014. In November 2014, it was announced that the festival would be directed by the two Upper Austrians Sebastian Höglinger and Peter Schernhuber from 2016 onwards. Starting in 2009, the two had already co-directed the YOUKI International Youth Media Festival.

The Diagonale 2009 took place from March 17 to 22 and attracted 23,876 visitors. A "Personale" was dedicated to filmmaker Mara Mattuschka, while the international Tribute brought German filmmaker Stefan Krohmer to Graz. The special historical programs were devoted to the history of Austrian animated film, film restoration or focused on the almost forgotten work of the Viennese screenwriter Anna Gmeyner, who was driven into exile. In 2009, acting prizes were awarded for the third time since 1999. One was the Grand Diagonale Acting Prize to Josef Hader for his achievements in Austrian film, and the other was the Diagonale Special Jury Prize for the remarkable performance by an Austrian actress/actor in a 2008 Diagonale film to Birgit Minichmayr, who stars alongside Hader in Der Knochenmann.

With around 24,800 visitors, the Diagonale 2010 (March 16 to 21) was able to draw a positive conclusion after six festival days and 147 films and videos shown. One of the highlights of the festival was the internationally acclaimed Peter Schreiner "Personale", which presented and honored the documentary work of the Austrian filmmaker in a concentrated form. In addition, Romuald Karmakar, one of the most important voices of German cinema at the time, was a guest in Graz with his films. Special historical programs focused on the almost forgotten work of auteur filmmaker Mansur Madavi and on that of cinematographer Günther Krampf, who was forced into exile. The industry meeting was dedicated to the funding model "Film Location Austria". Two exhibitions also took place as part of the Diagonale 2010 program: "SILENT ALIEN GHOST MACHINE MUSEUM" by Norbert Pfaffenbichler at Kunstverein Medienturm and "brRRMMMWHee – extended version" by Billy Roisz at Kunsthaus Graz.

In 2011, the Diagonale took place from March 22 to 27 and was opened by Nikolaus Geyrhalter's documentary essay film Abendland. The "Personale" was dedicated to the renowned avant-garde filmmaker Peter Tscherkassky. Director and cinematographer Elfi Mikesch, a representative of European auteur cinema with Austrian roots, presented her two most recent works at the festival. The special historical program "Shooting Women. Female Pioneers of Austrian Film" with films by Valie Export, Margareta Heinrich, and others. Other specials were devoted to the Viennese animation film festival "Tricky Women" and filmmaker Linda Christanell. A wide-ranging discussion of female filmmaking took place at the Diagonale 2011 not only in the film and supporting program, but also at the level of film policy. Representatives of the film industry demanded more visibility for women in the film business as well as a quota for women in film committees and in the university sector. At the Kunstverein Medienturm, Nadim Vardag showed his exhibition "∆" at the end of the "Concept Film" series, while Sabine Marte, creator of the 2011 festival trailer, exhibited together with Clemens Hollerer under the title "Do we need to have an accident?" at Kunsthaus Graz. The trilateral industry meeting focused on the "Digital Revolution" in sales and marketing. Finally, 2011 saw the launch of "Diagonale GOES GREEN," a long-term strategy of social responsibility for the environment and sustainability.

The 15th Diagonale in Graz took place from March 20 to 25, 2012. Despite a slightly lower number of screenings and events compared to 2011, the occupancy rate rose to almost 74 percent. The Diagonale 2012 program reflected the high quality of current Austrian filmmaking in a focused selection. As always, the festival functioned as a place of encounter and exchange between the film industry and the public. In addition to many established names, numerous young filmmakers also presented their works. The Diagonale 2012 opened with a feature film debut: Spain by Anja Salomonowitz. As part of the opening, Johannes Silberschneider received the Grand Diagonale Acting Prize for his services to Austrian film culture. The highlights of the festival also included a "Personale" dedicated to the legendary avant-garde filmmaker Ferry Radax, which made his groundbreaking work accessible to a wider audience once again with a concentrated selection of films. The Israeli documentary filmmaker Avi Mograbi, was represented not only by a comprehensive film retrospective but also by the video installation "Details". The special program Carl Mayer Screenwriting Prize 2017 "Shooting Women II" on female forms of documentary, the historical special on US actor and cinematographer Charles Korvin in the series "FilmExil" as well as the eagerly awaited revival of Michael Synek's Die toten Fische from 1989 were also well received by the audience. The discussion track focused in several program points on the status quo of film criticism and different positions of film discourse. At the Kunsthaus Graz, Sofie Thorsen showed the exhibition "Schnitt A-A". As part of the industry meeting "Discussing Diversity in Independent Cinema," numerous internationally staffed panels and case studies discussed different perspectives and strategies of film promotion and exploitation against the backdrop of practical experience and initiated further activities in Austria.

In 2013, the 16th edition of the festival took place from March 12 to 17 and was opened by Ulrich Seidl's Paradies: Hoffnung. A total of 156 films were shown in 136 screenings, 98 of which were in competition. Compared to the previous year, the Diagonale had 25,051 visitors (about 18,900 cinema admissions and about 6,000 people at the supporting programs), an increase of 1,300 visitors, while the occupancy rate dropped from 74 to 72 percent. The prizes awarded were worth about 155,000 euros. After a cinematic year marked by major international successes for Austrian film, attention at the 2013 Diagonale focused on the numerous promising productions by young filmmakers, whose individual approaches provided a breath of fresh air. Highlights also included the presentation of Ulrich Seidl's Paradise Trilogy as a complete work and two "Personale" dedicated to Josef Dabernig and Michaela Grill. With Dominik Graf there was an exceptional figure of the German-language production landscape in Graz. The continuation of the "FilmExil" series focused on the film work of Viennese director, screenwriter, and producer Paul Czinner. The special program "Austrian Pulp" presented subversive Austrian underground cinema between genres. The industry meeting was devoted to "Models of Substance and Project Development" with the participation of numerous international experts.

The 17th edition of the Diagonale opened in Graz with the Austrian premiere of Johannes Holzhausen's documentary Das große Museum. While in 2013 the focus was on numerous feature film premieres, this time, in line with the trend of the production year, the documentary film moved into the spotlight with 23 productions in competition. In total, the festival screened 192 films from March 18 to 23, 2014, 106 of which were in competition. Despite bright spring weather, a slight increase in audience attendance could again be reported after six days with around 25,500 visitors. The value of the film prizes awarded amounted to around 165,000 euros. The "Personale" was dedicated to the film artist Manfred Neuwirth. The renowned French cinematographer Agnès Godard was honored with a retrospective. The special programs on James Benning, Peter Lorre, the continuation of "Austrian Pulp" and the show "Another Country" on the occasion of the fiftieth anniversary of the Austrian Film Museum were well received by the public. The motto of the industry gathering was "Digital Revolution Meets Reality." As always, the festival positioned itself as an indispensable place of encounter and exchange between the film industry and the public. Ten years after the "resistance" Diagonale, protest was once again stirring. In a petition addressed to the governing parties and the management of the ORF, numerous representatives of the film industry warned of the immediate effects of impending funding cuts.

The Diagonale 2015 took place from March 17 to 22. The festival was held for the last time under the direction of Barbara Pichler, who retired from this position after seven years. Around 27,000 visitors were registered and 50 world premieres and 25 Austrian premieres were shown. In the competition 97 films were screened, a total of 157 films were shown. The festival was opened by Karl Markovics' feature film Superwelt. A highlight was the "Personale" dedicated to documentary filmmaker Nikolaus Geyrhalter. The international tribute guest was French director and author Mia Hansen-Løve. The special film history programs were devoted to the expelled avant-garde, the work of Alfred Kaiser and the tense relationship between film and history. Other specials were devoted to the rediscovered TV series Draußen in der Stadt, written by Günter Brödl, and to the two filmmakers Florian Flicker and Michael Glawogger, who had died the year before. The industry meeting addressed issues of film financing and film funding.

Directors Sebastian Höglinger and Peter Schernhuber (since 2016) 
The Diagonale 2016 took place from March 8 to 13 and was directed for the first time by Sebastian Höglinger and Peter Schernhuber. The two relied on a balance between continuity and new impulses and set a new record with 30,200 visitors. Two new program tracks, a new image, increased cooperation with local initiatives and institutions, and a newly established festival district contributed to the renewal. A total of 158 films were screened, 107 of them in competition. The festival opened with the world premiere of Mirjam Unger's Maikäfer flieg, based on the novel by Christine Nöstlinger. The new series "Spotlight on" focused on producer Gabriele Kranzelbinder. The provocatively titled historical special program "Austria: Forget it" was dedicated to a central phase of Austrian film and contemporary history: the Waldheim years. The new festival program "In Reference", in which U.S. indie director Matt Porterfield was a guest, opened up a wide range of references within the program. The Diagonale Film Meeting developed strategies for more equality and social diversity in film and television.

In 2017, the Diagonale took place for the twentieth time in Graz from March 28 to April 2. The festival was opened by Michael Glawogger's documentary Untitled, which film editor Monika Willi completed after Glawogger's unexpected death in 2014. A total of 191 films were shown, 106 of which competed in the competition for the Diagonale awards. These had a total value of around 195,000 euros. For the first time, the Franz Grabner Prize was awarded in the categories of cinema and television documentaries as part of the Diagonale. In the programming, cross-genre short film programs, and supporting films took account of the trend toward the merging of film genres. Thus, experimental works, music videos, feature films, and documentaries were positioned in relation to each other in the competition. With 31,200 visitors, the Diagonale was able to once again increase the audience response from the previous year (2016: 30,200). There was much positive feedback on the special historical program "1000 Beat Film", which looked for influences of pop culture on Austrian film and vice versa. The series "Spotlight on" focused on the integration figure Andi Winter, a filmmaker from the supposed second tier. U.S. director Ana Lily Amirpour presented her latest work The Bad Batch in Graz and held a master class. At the Diagonale Film Meeting, industry representatives from various sectors and functions shed light on the popularity and potential of Austrian film at home. The new discussion format "Diagonale im Dialog" brought illustrious personalities of the film world to the festival cinemas for extended talks.

In 2018, the Diagonale took place from March 13 to 18, with the opening film being Murer – Anatomy of a Trial by Christian Frosch.

The 2019 Diagonale, from March 19 to 24, opened with Der Boden unter den Füßen by Marie Kreutzer.

In 2020, the Diagonale, originally scheduled for March 24 to 29, was cancelled due to the COVID-19 pandemic. The award winners were announced on June 30, 2020. Films from the program of the cancelled Festival of Austrian Film were presented in spring, summer, and fall as part of the series "Diagonale'20 – 'Die Unvollendete' on Tour" at various stations across Austria and on the web.

In April 2020, the contracts of Sebastian Höglinger and Peter Schernhuber as festival directors were extended until 2022. The dual leadership will thus preside over the Festival of Austrian Film up to and including Diagonale'22. The position of artistic director will be advertised in summer 2021.

The 2021 edition, originally scheduled for March 16 to 21, was to open with the feature film Fuchs im Bau by Arman T. Riahi. Due to the COVID-19 pandemic, the edition was postponed to June 8 to 13, 2021.

Awards

The Festival of Austrian Film offers the film awards in various categories totalling over €170,000.-.

Award winners 
In the context of the Diagonale, expert juries award Austria's most highly endowed film prizes, including the two Grand Diagonale Prizes of the province of Styria (€21,000 each).

Grand Diagonale Prize

Diagonale Prize for Innovative Cinema

Diagonale Prize from the Youth Jury

Diagonale Prize for Short Feature and Short Documentary Film

Diagonale Acting Prizes 
On the initiative of the Verwertungsgesellschaft der Filmschaffenden VdFS, the Diagonale Acting Prizes have been awarded since 2008. The Grand Diagonale Acting Prize is awarded for services to Austrian film culture, whereas the Diagonale Acting Prize is awarded for a remarkable performance in a film of the respective Diagonale year. The trophy for the Grand Diagonale Acting Award is designed each year by an Austrian artist. 2008: Erwin Wurm, 2009: Elke Krystufek, 2010: Brigitte Kowanz, 2011: Peter Kogler, 2012: Elfie Semotan, 2013: Herbert Brandl, 2014: Eva Schlegel, 2015: Heimo Zobernig, 2016: Anna Paul, 2017: Stefanie Moshammer, 2018: Toni Schmale, 2019: Ashley Hans Scheirl, 2020: Daniel Spoerri.

Since 2010, the Diagonale Acting Prize has been awarded to both an actor and an actress.

Diagonale Cinematographers Prize 
The Association of Austrian Cinematographers awarded the AAC Prize for the best camera work of the year at the Diagonale in 2004 and 2005. For the association's thirtieth anniversary in 2006, two prizes were awarded for the first time, in the categories Best Cinematography Feature Film and Documentary Film, as the Diagonale Prize Cinematography. Since 2014 they have been endowed with 3,000 euros each.

Diagonale Prize for Editing 
Since 2005, the Austrian Editors Association (aea) has awarded a prize for the best artistic montage in a Diagonale competition film. In 2006, two editing prizes were awarded for the first time, in the categories Feature Film and Documentary Film. Since 2014, these prizes have been endowed with 3,000 euros each and are awarded by the jury of the Grand Diagonale Prize Best Feature Film and the Grand Diagonale Prize Best Documentary Film, respectively.

Diagonale Prize for Production Design and Costume Design 
On the initiative of the Austrian Filmdesigners Association VÖF, prizes for film design were awarded for the first time at the Diagonale in 2011 for Best Production Design and Best Costume Design. The prizes each consist of a cash prize, 3,000 euros, donated by the Verwertungsgesellschaft der Filmschaffenden VdFS, and a bronze sculpture by the artist Lotte Schegsch.

Diagonale Prize for Sound Design 
On the occasion of the tenth anniversary of the former Association of Austrian Sound Designers (VOESD), prizes were awarded for the first time at Diagonale 2013 for the best Sound Design in the Feature and Documentary Film categories. The prize consists of a cash prize, 3,000 euros each, donated by Verwertungsgesellschaft der Filmschaffenden VdFS.

Diagonale Audience Prize

Prize for Outstanding Production Services 
The prize, worth 22,000 euros, has been awarded since 2002 by the Verwertungsgesellschaft für audiovisuelle Medien (VAM) to an Austrian film production company or film producer for outstanding production services in the area of film. Either a specific film or the annual production of a film company is honored.

Carl Mayer Screenwriting Prizes 
The Carl Mayer Screenwriting Prizes have been awarded biennially since 1990 and annually since 1998. Since 2000, the award ceremony has been held as part of the Diagonale. It goes back to an initiative by Bernhard Frankfurter and is the most highly endowed screenwriting prize in Austria with 15,000 euros (since 1999, when it was increased to 200,000 schillings). Each competition has a new theme to which the anonymously submitted, not yet filmed screenplays must relate. In addition, the fictional or documentary material must be elaborated in a way suitable for cinema, the story must be true to life, well researched and well thought out, and the cinematographic potential must be exploited in all its facets, including formally.

In the first two competitions, only the Carl Mayer Screenwriting Prize was awarded. Since 1994, a prize of 7,500 euros for new authors has also been awarded. Both prizes are donated by the City of Graz. From 2000 to 2007, the ORF prize for material suitable for television, worth 4,000 euros, was also awarded as part of the Carl Mayer Screenwriting Prizes. Prior to that, material suitable for television was merely mentioned with praise in the jury's announcement. The prizes are only awarded if the jury can identify a script from the submitted scripts that meets the criteria. For this purpose, the jury may award several prizes in some years, or two prizes for new authors instead of one main prize (as happened in 2002).

Franz Grabner Award 
Since 2017 the Franz Grabner Award ceremony has been held as part of the festival.

Thomas Pluch Screenwriting Prizes 
Since the beginning of the Diagonale, the Thomas Pluch Screenwriting Prize ceremony has been held as part of the festival.

References

Literature 

 Christian Cargnelli: Auch ein Jammertal steht in einer Landschaft. Von den Österreichischen Filmtagen zur Diagonale: eine Chronik der Festivals des österreichischen Films. In: Meteor, Sondernummer "Österreichischer Film", March 1998.
 Christian Cargnelli: Jammertal Revisited. Eine Chronik der österreichischen Filmfestivals Diagonale von 1998 bis Anfang 2004. In: kolik.film, Sonderheft 1, March 2004.
 Michael Meisterhofer: . Diplomarbeit. Universität Wien, Wien 2015, 3. Filmfestival Diagonale, S. 14–34 (othes.univie.ac.at [PDF; 3,1 MB]).

External links 
Official Website

Film festivals in Austria
Festivals in Graz
Film festivals established in 1998